= Gobbet =

A gobbet is a short extract from a text which is set for commentary or translation in an examination. It is also sometimes used to refer to the question containing the gobbet, or commentary itself. It is typically seen in humanities subjects such as classics, history, literature, philosophy, and religion. Gobbets differ from essays in being focused on the examination of a single text, not needing to make an argument, and often not referring to additional sources.

The outline of a gobbet will vary, but it is usually a brief piece of analysis where the student must identify the source of the passage, place it in a wider context, and explain important names, terms, and references in the passage. The Durham University's Theology and Religion department suggests a gobbet answer should be around 500 words in length; the University of Exeter's "Hercules Project" suggests that a gobbet answer should be around one quarter of the length of an essay.
